The name USS Philippines has been used twice by the United States Navy:

 The first USS Philippines (ID-1677) was a troop transport used during 1919.
 The second  was to have been a large cruiser, but was cancelled in 1943.

United States Navy ship names